Sunshine City is the debut album by TV Rock.

Track listing
It Ain't Easy (Featuring Nancy Vice) - 3:18
Bimbo Nation (Featuring Nancy Vice) -  3:13
Hip House Is Back (Featuring Seany B) - 3:51
Flaunt It (Featuring Seany B) - 3:26
Unstoppable (Featuring Tyler Spencer) - 5:10
Wild Boys (Featuring Nancy Vice) - 4:50
Crank (Featuring Seany B) - 3:19
Liftin' Me Up (Featuring Abigail Bailey) - 4:58
Speakers Gonna Blow (Featuring Dino) - 3:09
New Day (Featuring Nancy Vice) - 5:52
The Power (TV Rock Vs. Tom Novy Vs. Snap!) - 3:39

2006 debut albums